Acalolepta aureofusca is a species of beetle in the family Cerambycidae. It was described by Per Olof Christopher Aurivillius in 1917. It is known to come from Australia.

References

Acalolepta
Beetles described in 1917